Valdemar (English: Waldemar; ; 1239 – 26 December 1302) was King of Sweden from 1250 to 1275.

Biography
Valdemar was the son of the Swedish princess Ingeborg Eriksdotter and Birger Jarl, from the House of Bjelbo. When her brother King Eric XI died in 1250, though a child, Valdemar was elected king and crowned the following year in the cathedral at Linköping. During the first sixteen years of his reign, it was Birger Jarl who was the real ruler. Birger Jarl had been the de facto ruler of Sweden from 1248, before the reign of Valdemar, even under Eric XI. Valdemar's mother and King Eric were children of King Eric X and Richeza of Denmark.

After Birger's death in 1266 Valdemar eventually came into conflict with his younger brother Magnus Birgersson, Duke of Södermanland, over taxation and personal matters.

In 1260, Valdemar married Sophia, the eldest daughter of King Eric IV of Denmark and Jutta of Saxony. Valdemar also had a relationship with his sister-in-law Jutta.  In 1272, Jutta visited Sweden and became Valdemar's mistress. The affair resulted in a child born in 1273. The following year, Jutta was placed in a convent and Valdemar was forced to make a pilgrimage to Rome to ask for the  absolution of the Pope.

Valdemar was deposed by his brother, Magnus after the Battle of Hova in Tiveden June 14, 1275. Magnus was supported by his brother, Eric Birgersson, Duke of Småland, and King Eric V of Denmark, who provided Danish soldiers. Magnus was elected King Magnus III of Sweden at the Stones of Mora.

In 1277, Sophia separated from her spouse and returned to Denmark and Valdemar managed to regain provinces in Gothenland in the southern part of the kingdom and was called the Duke of Götaland. However, Magnus regained them about 1278. In 1288 Valdemar was imprisoned by King Magnus in Nyköping Castle (Nyköpingshus) and lived openly with mistresses, possibly new wives, in comfortable confinement.

Family
Valdemar married Sofia of Denmark (died 1286) in 1260 and they separated in 1277. They had six children:
 Ingeborg Valdemarsdotter of Sweden, Countess of Holstein; spouse of Gerhard II, Count of Holstein-Plön.
 Erik Valdemarsson of Sweden (1272–1330)
 Marina Valdemarsdotter of Sweden; spouse of Rudolf, Count of Diepholz
 Richeza Valdemarsdotter of Sweden (died c. 1292); spouse of Przemysł II of Poland
 Katarina Valdemarsdotter of Sweden (died 1283)
 Margareta Valdemarsdotter of Sweden, a nun.

References

Sources
 Adolfsson, Mats När borgarna brann - svenska uppror (Stockholm: Natur & Kultur, 2007)
 Kyhlberg, Ola Gånget ut min hand (Riddarholmskyrkans stiftargravar Kungl. Vitterhets Historie och Antikvitets Akademien, Stockholm: 1997)
 Larsson, Mats G. Götarnas Riken : Upptäcktsfärder Till Sveriges Enande (Bokförlaget Atlantis AB. 2002) 
 Schück, Herman  Kyrka och rike - från folkungatid till vasatid (Stockholm: 2005)

External links

1239 births
1302 deaths
13th-century Swedish monarchs
Rulers of Finland
Medieval child monarchs
Christians of the Second Swedish Crusade
14th-century Swedish people
House of Bjelbo